Offachloritis dryanderensis is a species of air-breathing land snails, terrestrial pulmonate gastropod mollusks in the family Camaenidae. This species is endemic to Australia.

References

 2006 IUCN Red List of Threatened Species.   Downloaded on 7 August 2007.

Gastropods of Australia
dryanderensis
Vulnerable fauna of Australia
Gastropods described in 1872
Taxonomy articles created by Polbot